Madinat (also Romanized as Madīnāt; also known as ‘Arab Nāşer, Madīnāt Shameh, and Mudāināth) is a village in Mosharrahat Rural District, in the Central District of Ahvaz County, Khuzestan Province, Iran. At the 2006 census, its population was 267, in 39 families.

References 

Populated places in Ahvaz County